CCGS Goéland is a training vessel of the Canadian Coast Guard and located at the Canadian Coast Guard College in Westmount, Nova Scotia. The ship is based on the 44-foot motor lifeboat, a converted self-righting lifeboat and similar to the Waveney-class lifeboat.

See also

  and

References

External links

 CCGS Goeland at Canadian Coast Guard

Motor lifeboats of the Canadian Coast Guard
1985 ships
Ships built in Ontario
Service vessels of Canada